The Fort Payne Opera House, located at 510 Gault Avenue North in Fort Payne, DeKalb County in the U.S. state of Alabama built during the industrial boom in 1889.  The Fort Payne Opera House is the only one in the State of Alabama still in use. The establishment has been used as a movie theater, live theater and a public forum. The Opera House still hosts live theatrical events and is on the  National Register of Historic Places and the National Register of 19th Century Theaters in America. Completely restored, the Opera House is a cultural center of the community.

References

Theatres in Alabama
National Register of Historic Places in DeKalb County, Alabama
Theatres on the National Register of Historic Places in Alabama
Buildings and structures in DeKalb County, Alabama
Opera houses on the National Register of Historic Places
Event venues on the National Register of Historic Places in Alabama
Opera houses in Alabama